Washington Township is a former township of Boone County, Arkansas, USA.  Its last appearance on the US Census was in 1950.

Population history

Other townships
The Geographic Names Information System lists 13 townships named Washington in various counties in Arkansas.

References
 United States Census Bureau 2008 TIGER/Line Shapefiles
 United States Board on Geographic Names (GNIS)
 United States National Atlas

External links

 US-Counties.com
 City-Data.com

Townships in Boone County, Arkansas
Townships in Arkansas